Ericentrodea homogama is a species of flowering plant in the family Asteraceae. It is found only in Ecuador, where its natural habitat is subtropical or tropical moist montane forests. It is threatened by habitat loss.

References

Coreopsideae
Flora of Ecuador
Near threatened plants
Plants described in 1923
Taxonomy articles created by Polbot